Pinet Butte.png
Pinet Butte is a small butte comprising the westernmost portion of the Caudal Hills, in Victoria Land. Mapped by United States Geological Survey (USGS) from surveys and U.S. Navy air photos, 1960–64. Named by Advisory Committee on Antarctic Names (US-ACAN) for Paul R. Pinet, geologist at McMurdo Station, 1966–67.

Buttes of Antarctica
Landforms of Victoria Land
Pennell Coast